Hephzibah may refer to:

People
Hephzibah Menuhin, a pianist and human rights activist
Hepzibah Swan, a socialite of late 18th- and early 19th-century Boston

Fictional characters
Hepzibah (or Hephzibah (Hezekiah’s wife)), a figure in the Second Book of Kings in the Bible
Hepzibah (comics), a character from the Marvel Comic universe
Miss Mam'selle Hepzibah, a character from the comic Pogo
Hephzibah “Eppie” Marner, a character from the novel Silas Marner
Hepzibah Smith, a minor character in the Harry Potter novels
Hepzibah Pyncheon, a main character in The House of the Seven Gables
Hephzibah (warrior), a main character in the Apocalypse of Zerubbabel

Locations
Hephzibah, Georgia, United States
Hephzibah High School, in that town
Hephzibah, Pennsylvania
Hepzibah, Taylor County, West Virginia
Hepzibah, Harrison County, West Virginia
Hephzibah Jenkins Townsend's Tabby Oven Ruins, an archaeological site in South Carolina